Sangeeta Gupta (born 25 May 1958), a retired Chief Commissioner of Income Tax, is an Indian abstract artist, poet and filmmaker. She is the first woman who qualified Civil Services from her district in Uttar Pradesh, India. She is an officer of 1984 batch IRS. Her artistic journey so far consist of 35 solo exhibitions of paintings, 25 published books including Fourteen anthologies of poems in Hindi and six in English. From her collection of poems, 10 books are translated into German, Greek, Mandarin, English, Bangla, Dogri, Tamil and Urdu. She has also directed, scripted and shot 30 documentary films, 6 of which are in the collection of Library of Congress, US. Song of the Cosmos is her creative biography.

A film, Life beyond Tax, has been made about her life by Tax India.

Personal life and education 
Sangeeta Gupta (B.Sc., M.A, L.L.B) born at Gorakhpur, U.P. in 1958 spent her childhood in Tamkuhi road a small town, part of Kushinagar district, Uttar Pradesh. She completed her schooling from Carmel School, Gorakhpur, graduation and Post-graduation from Banaras Hindu University and Law from Delhi University, India

Career 
Sangeeta Gupta started her career as a Junior Research Fellow at Advance Study Centre for Nepal, Department of Political Science, Banaras Hindu University in 1979 after completing her post graduation from the same university. She joined as a Lecturer of Political Science in a Government Degree College affiliated to Gorakhpur University in 1980 and continued to teach Political science to the under graduates students there till 1984. She then qualified Civil Services examination and then joined as Indian Revenue Service Officer (1984 batch). She is the first woman from her district, who qualified Civil Services.  

She served as Income Tax Officer from 1986 to 1988 June at Allahabad. Thereafter, she served as ACIT; ADIT & DCIT in West Bengal till the year 1996. She then went on deputation to Delhi Jal Board as Director Revenue and served there till 31 March 1999. She was promoted as JCIT and also worked as Director IT in CBDT, Minister of Finance, was promoted as CIT in the year 2003 and since then has worked in various capacity. Sangeeta Gupta joined as Principal Commissioner of Income Tax, Jammu & Kashmir in July 2015. Before coming to Jammu she was PCIT at Delhi. She rose to the apex level as Chief Commissioner of Income Tax, Delhi on account of her dedication and hard work. She accepted many challenging assignments, which she accomplished to the satisfaction of the hierarchy.

She has also worked as Advisor (Finance and Administration) to Lalit Kala Akademi, National Akademi of Visual Arts (July 2019 to January 2020). She is a member of the Finance committee of Jawaharlal Nehru University since November 2018.

She was awarded gold medal in 1986 by National Academy of Direct Taxes, Nagpur for being the best probationer of her batch and the best bureaucrat of the year award of Make in India Excellence award conferred by Indo Global Business Council, Delhi

She has done her town, district and state proud by her achievements in her career. She retired as Chief Commissioner of Income Tax, Delhi in May 2018.

Professional Achievements 
During her short stint in the State in Jammu & Kashmir as Principal Commissioner of Income Tax the department produced remarkable results. Four new income tax offices at moffusil stations were opened at Katra, Samba, Baramulla and Rajouri and were made operational. Her tremendous efforts for widening and deepening of tax base at all levels finally bore fruits and resulted in addition of substantial new tax payers.

Apart from a successful bureaucrat during her career, Sangeeta Gupta is known for her love for poetry and Abstract Art.

For her, abstract art is a means to reach the non-objective experiences that help shape the inner life. It is a witness to the fact that man's spiritual needs do not disappear even in times engulfed by gross materialism. She strives to express the poetic vision in her works. Keeping in view her strong passion for painting and writing, one may think, what about her professional achievements as a Revenue officer. But the fact is that she has earned distinctions in different fields like art, literature, film making and civil services.

Social pursuits 

In the year 1995 she held her first solo exhibition at Birla Academy of Art & Culture, Kolkata, which was inaugurated by none other than Mother Teresa. The entire sale proceeds of this show were donated to CRY for building up an educational centre for poor children in sub urban part of Kolkata. She has held 35 solo exhibitions all over India including Delhi, Mumbai, Kolkata, Bangalore, Hyderabad, Lucknow, Chandigarh and overseas in London, Berlin, Munich, Lahore Belfast (Northern Ireland), Thessaloniki (Greece) and Toronto (Canada).

In August, 2013, her 26th solo exhibition dedicated to Uttarakhand was inaugurated by the former President of India Dr. A P J Abdul Kalam. The fund of Rs.20 lakh raised through the sale proceeds of her paintings has been used for creating a Fine Art Education Grant for the fine arts students of Uttarakhand.

She is promoting Art and Culture through Prithvi Fine Art & Culture Centre, a charitable society of Delhi. As part of a cultural exchange programme of Prithvi, she was instrumental in organising an exhibition of 18 Greek artists at Lalit Kala Academi, Delhi (2014) and in 2015 a group of seven artists of India were represented in an exhibition at EMS Museum Gallery Thessaloniki (Greece) as part of a  Cultural Exchange project.

She has participated in more than 200 group shows in India and abroad, in national exhibitions of Lalit Kala Akademi, AIFACS and Sahitya Kala Parishad and in several art camps.

Her paintings are in the permanent collection of the Bharat Bhavan Museum, Bhopal, Museum of Sacred Art (MOSA) Belgium and Macedonian Museum of Contemporary Art, Thessaloniki (Greece). Her works have been represented at the India Art Fair, New Delhi in 2011, 2013, 2014, 2015, 2016, 2018 and 2019. As part of Indian Delegation she held a solo exhibition of paintings at Shenzhen, China, 11th International Cultural and Industrial fair 2015.

Apart from winning all India awards for drawing and painting her works occupy space on the walls of the country's most prestigious residences and offices including those of the President and Prime Minister as well as Governors of Karnataka and Jammu and Kashmir. Also, she dabbles in several other fields like photography and she has taken part in national exhibitions of photography in 1999 and 2001, New Delhi.

Contributions 

 
She has to her credit 25 published books, 10 of her poetry books are translated in several languages. She is a bilingual poet and has fourteen anthologies of poems in Hindi and six in English to her credit.
 Antas Se (1988)
 Nagfani Ke Jungle (1991)
Iss Paar Uss Paar (1996)
Samudra Se Lautati Nadi (1999)
Pratinaad (2005)
Lekhak Ka Samay(2006)
Weaves Of Time (2013)
Ladakh: Knowing the Unknown (2015)
 Sparsh Ke Gulmohar (2015)
Ekam (2017)
 Song of Silence (2018)
 Beparwah Ruh (2018)
 Mussavir ka Khayal (2018)
Song of the Cosmos (2018)
 Roshani Ka Safar (2019)
 Lal Butti Ke Bachhe (2019)
 Beej sirf Zamin Par Ugate Hain (2019)
 Ek Khawab Aasama Hua Jata Hai (2019)
 Jammu: Shades of Time (2019)
 Kashmir: Spirit of Solace (2019)
 Ends are beginnings (2021)
 Rise from your ashes (2021)
 Hymn to Trees (2021)
 In Dino (2021)
 Nadi ko Naav mein bhar (2021)
 
Her books of poems are translated in many languages, in Greek, Mandarin, English, German, Bangla, Dogri and Urdu.
Sangeeta Gupta's collection of poems Iss Par Uss Par, has been translated in Bangla and Pratinaad, has also been translated in Bangla, English and German. Weaves of Time, a collection of English poems was published in 2013 by Partridge, a Penguin company, which is  translated in Greek and Mandarin Sparsh Ke Gulmohar (collection of Hindi poems published by Rajkamal Prakashan 2015) also translated in Dogri.

"Ladakh: Knowing the unknown" published by Full Circle 2015 launched at Jaipur Literature Festival 2015, Nehru Centre London and in Thessaloniki, Greece. EKAM a book of poems and photographs published in 2017, launched at Jaipur Literature Festival 2017.

In 2020, Weaves of Time and Song of Silence, both books are translated and published in Mandarin.

Books in the collection of Library of Congress, US:

Echoing grove : poems & paintings / Sangeeta Gupta ; translation, Keshav    Malik. Published by National Publishing House, New Delhi, 2005.

Visions illuminations / Keshav Malik ; paintings by Sangeeta Gupta. Published by Kumar Gallery, New Delhi, 2008.

Ladakh : knowing the unknown / Sangeeta Gupta. Published by Full Circle, New Delhi, 2015

Sparsh ke gulmohar : poems by Sangeeta Gupta. Published by Rājakamala Prakāśana, New Delhi, 2015.

Ekam / Sangeeta Gupta. Published by Prithvi Fine Art & Cultural Centre, New Delhi, 2017

Jammu : shades of time / Sangeeta Gupta. Published by Prithvi Fine Art & Cultural Centre, New Delhi, 2019.

Kashmir : spirit of solace / Sangeeta Gupta. Published by Prithvi Fine Art & Cultural Centre, New Delhi, 2019.

Ends are beginnings / Sangeeta Gupta.Published by Prithvi Fine Art & Cultural Centre, New Delhi, 2020.

Song of silence : a poet's inner journey / Sangeeta Gupta ; translation, Dr. Barathi Srinivasan. Published by Prithvi Fine Art & Cultural Centre, New Delhi, 2020

Rise from your ashes / Sangeeta Gupta. Published by Prithvi Fine Art & Cultural Centre, New Delhi, 2021.

En dino : Hindi poems and paintings / by Sangeeta Gupta. Published by Prithvi Fine Art & Cultural Centre, New Delhi, 2021.

Nadi ko naav me bhar : Hindi poems and photographs / by Sangeeta Gupta.  Published by Prithvi Fine Art & Cultural Centre, New Delhi, 2021.

Documentary film maker 
She has also directed, scripted and shot thirty documentary films. Her films have been screened at various venues overseas and in India.  The list of films produced by her over the years are as follows:
 Keshav Malik: A look back, a documentary film (2012)
 Keshav Malik: The truth of art, a documentary film (2013)
 Keshav Malik: Root, branch bloom, a documentary film (2013)
 MahaKumbh: Astha ka mahaparv, a documentary film (hindi) (2013)
 Weaves of time, a documentary film (2013)
 Greece: Continuum of consciousness, a documentary film (2015)
 MahaKumbh Ujjain: Salila Ka MahaKavya, a documentary film (Hindi) (2020)
 MahaKumbh Ujjain: An epic of the river (English) (2021)
 Compassion: A film by Sangeeta Gupta (2021)
 Kung fu nuns in mystic Ladakh, a documentary film (2013)
 Ladakh Calling : A film by Sangeeta Gupta (2021)
 Ladakh: Knowing the unknown (2021)
 Ladakh: The awakened snow desert (2021)
 Ladakh: The land of passes and gompas (2021)
 Amritsar - Attari: The Last Village (2021)
 Amritsar - Attari: Antim Gaon (2021) 
 Kashmir: Visual Diary of a Passionate Outsider Part 1 (2021)
 Kashmir: Visual diary of a passionate outsider Part 2 (2021)
 Kashmir: Visual diary of a passionate outsider Part 3 (2021)
 India's Pride | Republic Day | Beating Retreat Ceremony (2021)
 My Trip To Oslo, Norway (2022)
 My trip to Cypress (2022)
 Chinese Tea Ceremony (2022)
 Exploring Petra The Lost City (2022)
 Madaba : Jordan's Mosaic City (2022)
 Amman : Jordan's White Capital (2022)
 A day in the life of The man of glass : Raja Azhar Idris (2022)
 Go too far to find yourself (2022)
 JERASH : Jordan's Incredible Roman Ruins (2022) 
 Wadi Rum : Valley of the Moon, Magical desert of Jordan

Her 6 films are in the collection of Library of Congress, USA.

2012: She directed, scripted and shot her first documentary film, Keshav Malik- A Look Back, which was screened at Kiran Nadar Museum of Modern Art at Delhi, ICCR Azad Bhavan at New Delhi, Sanskriti Kendra at Anandgram, New Delhi in 2012 and at Art 4 all – artists residency and  at Kala Ghora Art Festival, Mumbai in 2013.
 2013: Her two documentaries, Keshav Malik – Root, Branch, Bloom (approx. 30 Minutes) and Keshav Malik - The Truth of Art (approx. 30 Minutes), were screened by India International Centre and Indira Gandhi National Centre for the Arts, Delhi in 2013 and at Alliance Francaise de Delhi in the Spring Festival, 2014. This film was telecast by the TV channel DD Bharati several times in January 2014 and on Lok Sabha TV in April, 2014 several times. This film has been selected and is in the archive of Documentary Edge Campus, a resource centre for documentary films, New Zealand to be used for educational and research purposes.
 Her fourth film, Maha Kumbh - Astha Ka Mahaparv, screened at Sanskriti Kendra, Anandgram, New Delhi.  A documentary film Weaves of Time, was screened at India Habitat Centre, Delhi in December, 2013.
 2014: Her film, Kung Fu Nuns in Mystic Ladakh was telecast by the TV channel DD Bharati several times in September 2014, also  selected and screened at 3rd Delhi International Film Festival 2014.
2015: Greece – Continuum of Consciousness, was screened in Thessaloniki, Greece.

Exhibitions

Solo exhibitions : selected Indian participation   
 
1995: Birla Academy of Art & Culture, Kolkata in aid of CRY
1996: Genesis Art Gallery, Calcutta
1997: AIFACS, New Delhi
1998: AIFACS, New Delhi
1998: Lalit Kala Academi, New Delhi
1999: Lalit Kala Academi, Lucknow
2000: Triveni Gallery, New Delhi
2000: Chitra Kala Parishad, Bangalore
2002: Shridharani Art Gallery, New Delhi
2002: IndusInd Art Gallery, Chandigarh
2002: Jehangir Art Gallery, Mumbai
 2003: Kumar Gallery & India International Centre, Lodhi Road, New Delhi
 2004: Shridharani Art Gallery, New Delhi
 2004: Kumar Gallery, New Delhi
2005: Birla Academy of Art & Culture, Kolkata
2006: Kumar Gallery, New Delhi and Jehangir Gallery, Mumbai
2007: Kumar Gallery, New Delhi and Museum Gallery, Mumbai
2010: Lalit Kala Akademi, New Delhi, Karnatka Chitrkala Parishath, Bangalore
2011: Shrishti Art Gallery, Hyderabad
2012: Jehangir Art Gallery, Mumbai
2013: Azad Art Gallery, I.C.C.R, Delhi
2016: Art Konsult Gallery, Delhi
2017: Art Konsult Gallery, Delhi
2018: Prithvi Fine Art and Cultural Centre, Delhi
2019: Prithvi Fine Art and Cultural Centre, Delhi
2020: Revolutionizing the native natural indigo technique through "Adiyogi Shiva: A journey in Cosmic Indigo", The Largest Painting ever by Sangeeta Gupta at Prithvi Fine Art and Cultural Centre, Delhi
2022: Aadiyogi Shiv: A Journey in cosmic indigo, textile paintings traveling exhibition, exhibited at Bikaner House, Delhi Bihar Museum, Patna,  NIFT Delhi, NIFT Patna. 
Sangeeta Says "In this series of works I have tried to remind people of my country, India to take pride in our heritage. Khadi and Neel are our very own since ages. Our block printing technique is our own age-old way of chhapakala which is now becoming extinct. Machine has made everything so mechanical and impersonal. I just wanted to give some new, abstract idioms to our chhapakala which may be refreshing and contemporary.

I have also painted Sanskrit text on some paintings to quote Aadi Shankaracharya specially his Shivoham stotra and Ardhnarinateshwar stotra.

All this has never been executed by any other artist as far as I know."

Solo exhibitions : selected international participation 

2000: Nehru Centre & India Club, London
2003: Tagore Culture Centre, Indian Embassy, Berlin, Germany
2003: Galerie Muller & Plate, Munich, Germany
2005: National College of Arts, Lahore, Pakistan
2005: Hamail Art Gallery, Lahore, Pakistan
2014: Ramada Plaza, Belfast, Northern Ireland
2015: EMS Museum Gallery, Thessaloniki, Greece
2019: Heritage Mississauga Museum, Mississauga, Toronto, Canada

Selected group participation – international 

2001: Opera House, Vienna.
2001: Galerie Muller & Plate, Munich, Germany.
2002: Galerie Muller & Plate, Munich, Germany.
2004: Amrita Shergil Revisited-on the eve of Internationals Women Day, ICCR, New Delhi, show travelled to State Museums at Tashkent, Brishkek and Almaty in Central Asia.
2004: Hamail Art Gallery, Lahore, Pakistan.
2005: India-Korea Art Show at Visual Art Gallery, India Habitat Centre, Delhi.
2007: Women Artists of South East Asian Countries, Hamail Art Gallery, Lahore, Pakistan.
2007: 25 Contemporary Artists of India, Moscow Museum, Moscow.
2007: Group Show at Mississauga, Canada.
2010: Group show Indian Artists at San Francisco, USA.
2015: Seven Indian Artists, Group Exhibition, EMS Museum Gallery, Thessaloniki, Greece.
2015: Exhibition of water colour, International Union of Mail Art, Thessaloniki, Greece.
2015: Forms of Devotion, The Spiritual in Indian Art, Museum of Sacred Art, Belgium.
2015: India Festival at Technopolis, Athens, Greece.
2015–16: Forms of Devotion, an exhibition of Indian Art at China Art Museum, Shanghai, China (November 2015 to February 2016)
2016: Forms of Devotion, an exhibition of Indian Art at central museum at Conde Duque in Central Madrid
2017: 3rd Jerusalem Biennale, Jerusalem.
2019: Symposium of Women Artists, Nicosia and Kyrenia, Cyprus
2019: Gallery 26, Oslo, Norway
2019: Symphony of Colors, Galerie Metanoia, Paris
2019: Senlis Sacred Art Festival, France
2022: Ras Al-Ain Gallery, Amman, Jordan.
2022: Fine Arts Department, Luxor University, Luxor, Egypt.
2022: KL International Art Exhibition 'New Horizon', Kuala Lumpur, Malaysia.

Selected group participation – India 

1996: Rotary Club of Calcutta at Chitrakoot Gallery, Calcutta.
1997: Taj Palace, New Delhi by ‘People for Animals’
1998: Stelstar Show in aid to Sahyog at India Habitat Centre, New Delhi
1999:  Antahkaran Gallery, New Delhi
1999: Greenwood Gallery, New Delhi
2000: Gallery Freedom at Lalit Kala Academy, New Delhi
2000: AIFACS, New Delhi
2000: Centre for Punjabi Literature and Art, New Delhi
2000: Art Today, New Delhi
2000: AIFACS, New Delhi paintings for Kargil Jawans
2000: Art Folio, Chandigarh
2000: Academy of Fine Arts & Literature, New Delhi
2000: Gallery Freedom, New Delhi
2001: Gallery Freedom & India Habitat Centre, New Delhi for Gujarat Earthquake Victims
2001: Academy of Fine Arts & Literature, New Delhi
2001: U.P. Lalit Kala Academy, Lucknow
2001: Art Junction Gallery, New Delhi
2001: Cymroza Art Gallery, Mumbai
2001: Russian Cultural Centre, New Delhi
2001: Stree Shakti at Habiart Gallery, New Delhi
2002: Uttar Pradesh Lalit Kala Academy, Meerut
2002: Gallery Chemistry of Colours, New Delhi
2002: All India Art Exhibition, AIFACS, New Delhi
2002: Gallery Chemistry of Colours, New Delhi
2002: Art an Expression of Peace, Habiart Gallery, New Delhi.
2003: Inaugural show of the new gallery, Dhoomimal Art Gallery, New Delhi
2004: Charity show for the new building of Alliance Francaise, French Embassy in New Delhi
2004: Art & Poetry-Harvest 2004 - Indian Contemporary Art, Arushi Art Gallery, New Delhi
2004: Group show of five women artist, Capitol Court, Ashoka Hotel, New Delhi
2004: Inaugural group show of the new gallery, Kumar Art Gallery, New Delhi
2005: Contemporary Women Artist of India, Government Art Gallery, Hyderabad
2005: Spring 2005 at Punjab Academy, New Delhi
2005: Art Felt Gallery, New Delhi
2005: Dhumimal Art gallery, Annual Show, New Delhi
2005: Concluding Golden Jubilee Celebration Group show, Kumar Gallery, Delhi
2005: Group Show organized by Gargi Seth, Lalit Kala Academy, New Delhi
2005: Mute Dialogues, A Group Show at Habiart Gallery, IHC, New Delhi
2005: 10th Harmony Show, Mumbai
2006: Arushi Art Gallery, New Delhi
2006: Kumar Gallery, New Delhi
2006: Visual Art Gallery, India Habitat Centre organized by Ganesha Gallery, New Delhi
2007: Kumar Gallery, New Delhi
2007: Ati Art Gallery at New Delhi and Bangalore
2007: Fine Arts Academy, New Delhi by Arushi Art Gallery
2008: Annual Show of Kumar Art Gallery (Jan. 2008), New Delhi
2008: A show of four women artists, Alliance France (Nov.2008), New Delhi
2008: Dus Mahavidyas, A show of ten women artists of the world held at Visual Art Gallery, New Delhi,  Tao Art Gallery, Mumbai and Time & Space Gallery, Bangalore
2009: Art Mantra Gurgaon
2009: Art Junction, The Lalit, New Delhi
2009: Annual Show of Arushi Art Gallery, New Delhi
2010: Annual Show of Kumar Art Gallery, New Delhi
2010: Annual show of Tao Art Gallery, Mumbai
2010: “Savera” charity auction at The Lalit, New Delhi
2010: Art Mantra, Visual Art Gallery , New Delhi
2010: “Nai Ummeed” The Art Festival, The Lalit, New Delhi
2010: Inaugural Ceremony of Celebrating 150 yrs of I.T.Deptt., a group show held in Delhi, the show will travel to 16 cities of India
2011: Group Show, Claridges, Surajkund organized by Prithvi Fine Art & Cultural Centre, New Delhi
2011: Concluding ceremony of Celebrating 150 yrs of I. T. Deptt., a group show held in Delhi
2012: Bharat Bhawan Museum, Bhopal
2012: Lalit Kala Akademi, New Delhi
2013: College of Art, Chandigarh University
2014: Gallery Radhika Art Initiative, Lado Sarai, Delhi
2015: Contemporary Art Show by India’s 40 Master artists, ICAC at Jahangir art Gallery, Mumbai.
 2015: Yog Chakra, an exhibition of Paintings organized by Sangeet Natak Academy, Ministry of Culture, Government of India
 2015: 28th National Exhibition of Contemporary Art, South Central Zone Cultural Centre, Ministry of Culture at Bharat Bhawan, Bhopal
2016: Five Elements, a group show of women artist at Veva Art, Pune.
2016: An Overwhelming Imagination: The Junction of Interactivity, Art Konsult, Delhi
2016: India Art Festival, Art Konsult, Delhi.
2016: Blue Beyond Dimensions, Gallery Sree Arts, Delhi
2018: Mortality and Beyond, Gallery 78, Hyderabad.
 2019: Sculpt for Delhi, India International Centre, Delhi
 2019: Journey of light, small format, Prithvi Fine Art and Cultural Centre, Delhi
 2019: Confluence of Aesthetics, Reves Art Gallery, Bangalore
 2019: Women artists exhibition, National Gallery Of Modern Art, Delhi
 2020: Public art for delhi, Visual art gallery,India Habitat centre, Delhi
 2021: Empowered women, Prithvi Fine Art and Cultural Centre, Delhi.
 2021: Let Light Descend on Earth, Prithvi Fine Art and Cultural Centre, Delhi.
 2022: Awadh Art Festival, Visual Arts Gallery, India Habitat Centre, New Delhi
 2022: Palash festival of Art, IGNCA, New Delhi.
 2022: I have a dream, Masha Art, Gurugram.
 2022: Inner face of Reality, Prithvi Fine Art and Cultural Centre, Delhi.
 2022: Truth Remains, Prithvi Fine Art and Cultural Centre, Delhi.

Awards 

Sangeeta's contribution in various fields have been recognised and acknowledged by both government and non government agencies. These awards are testimony of the well deserved accolades.

 2021: Longest painting made with natural indigo colour and dye, India Book of Records
 2021: Longest painting made on handspun khaddar, Miracles World Records
 2020-22: Longest painting on textile, Limca Book of Records
 2020: Critic's choice award, World University of Design
 2020: Literoma Nari Samman, Kolkata,
 2019: Lifetime achievement award 2019, Art Fiesta, Jaipur for her contribution in the field of fine arts.
 2019: Excellence award, beyond the boundaries, AKP Healing India, Delhi.
 2019: Elite women of the year 2019, Elite magazine, Delhi.
 2018: Impressions Icon award, Delhi.
 2018: Global achievers award, Nirbhya Jyoti Trust, Delhi.
 2018: Indian Iconic Personality award, Vishwashanti Seva charitable Trust.
 2018:  Raja Ravi Varma Chitrakar Samman, Megh Mandal Sansthan, Mumbai.
 2018: Kala Vibhuti Samman, Sai Shinjini, Academy of Fine Arts & Culture, Delhi.
 2018:  Pratibha Samman 2018, Women of Substance Award- category- Writer and Artist by Namaskar Dunia, Delhi.
 2018: Certificate of  Recognition, Phenomenal SHE, 2018 by Indian National Bar Association and Alliance Francaise, Delhi.
 2018:  Naari Gaurav Samman, 2018 by Rajasthani Academy, Delhi.
 2018: Kalptaru Award,2018 category- Art and Poetry by Kalptaru Academy, Delhi.
 2017:  Achievers Award,  2017 by India Eye International Human  Rights Observer, Delhi on the occasion of celebration of International Day of the Girl Child.
 2017: 8th Rajiv Gandhi Excellence Award,  2017 by Pehchan (An NGO, Nurturing the girl child), Delhi.
 2017: Literary Award, 2017 at IIC, New Delhi by Bharat Nirman, Delhi.
 2016: Certificate of Merit Awarded by South Central Zone Cultural Center Nagpur, Ministry of Culture, Government of India for painting executed in Ujjain Mahakumbh, 2016.
 2016: 7th Rajiv Gandhi Excellence Award, 2016 by Pehchan (An NGO, Nurturing the girl child), Delhi.
 2016: The Great Women Achievers Awards - 2016 by The Performer (group of art & culture), Jammu.
 2016:  Bureaucrat​ of the year, Make in India Excellence award by IGBC, Delhi.
 2016:  Kala Drishti Award for exemplary work done in the field of Civil Service & Art.
 2015: Delhi Gaurav Award 2015 in Professional category for Art & Culture by Indian Brave Hearts supported by Ministry of Social Justice & Empowerment, Government of India.
 2015: 6th Rajiv Gandhi Excellence Award, India Habitat Centre, New Delhi by Pehchan (An NGO, Nurturing the girl child).
 2015: India Excellence Award for Poetry 2015 by Bharat Nirmaan, Delhi.
 2015:  Priyadarshini Award 2015 as an International Cultural Entrepreneur by the Ministry of Micro, Small and Medium Entrepreneur (MSME).
 2015:  35thWomen Entrepreneurship Award by Bharat Nirmaan, Delhi.
 2015:  Global Women Achievers Award by IGBC, Delhi.
 2014: Awarded and honored as an Artist by 3rd Delhi International Film Festival.
 2014: Poet of the Year award by 3rd Delhi International Film Festival.
 2013: 6thNational Women Excellence Award by Yog Confederation of India in collaboration with International Women Excellence Awards Organization.
 2013: Women Achievers Award from Indian Council for UN relations on the eve of International Women’s Day.
 2013: Vishwa Hindi Pracheta Alankaran by Uttar Pradesh Hindi Saahitya  Sammelan &​​ Utkarsh Academy, Kanpur.
 2012:Udbhav Shikhar Samman by Udbhav Samajik Sanskritik Aivum Sahityik Sansthan for achievements in the field of art and literature.
 2005:  77th annual award for painting in 2005 by AIFACS, New Delhi.
 1999: Hindprabha award for Indian Women Achievers by Uttar Pradesh Mahila Manch in 1999.
 1998: 69th annual award for drawing in 1998 by AIFACS, New Delhi.
 1986: Gold Medal for Best Probationer (1984 Indian Revenue Services).

References

External links 

Living people
1958 births
Women artists from Uttar Pradesh
20th-century Indian women artists
21st-century Indian women artists
Indian women painters